Mannat   is a Pakistani mystery drama series, produced by Babar Javed. The drama airs  weekly on Geo Entertainment every Friday. It stars Sami Khan and Rabab Hashim in lead roles. The series marks the fifth appearance of Rabab Hashim and Sami Khan after their joint appearances in Piya Mann Bhaye, Ishqaaway, Anaya Tumhari Hui and Mannchali.

Cast

Main Cast
Rabab Hashim as Mannat
Zaib Rehman as Mir Amma
Sami Khan as Dilnawaz

Recurring Cast
Uzma Hassan
Iffat Rahim
Kashif Mehmood
Zainab Qayyum
Mohammad Ali
Khalid Saleem Butt
Zoya Khan

Special Appearance
Jana Malik
Nouman Javaid

References

Pakistani family television dramas
Geo TV original programming
Urdu-language television shows
2010s mystery television series
2016 Pakistani television series debuts